Nicole Mitchell is an American politician and meteorologist serving as a member of the Minnesota Senate for the 47th district since 2023.

Early life and education 
Mitchell was raised in Woodbury, Minnesota. She earned a Bachelor of Arts degree in communications from the University of Minnesota and Juris Doctor from the Georgia State University College of Law.

Career 
Mitchell served as a meteorologist in the Air Force Reserve Command from 2003 to 2019. She also worked as an on-air meteorologist for CBS News, The Weather Channel, the Al Jazeera Media Network, Hubbard Broadcasting, and Minnesota Public Radio. She was elected to the Minnesota Senate in 2022.

References

External links

Living people
Minnesota Democrats
American meteorologists
University of Minnesota alumni
Georgia State University College of Law alumni
People from Woodbury, Minnesota
Year of birth missing (living people)